Senator Loveland may refer to:

Joseph H. Loveland (1859–1938), Vermont State Senate
Ralph A. Loveland (1819–1899), New York State Senate
Valoria Loveland (born 1943), Washington State Senate